Gümüşkaya is a village in the Adıyaman District, Adıyaman Province, Turkey. Its population is 1,800 (2021).

The hamlet of Aşağıgöze is attached to the village.

References

Villages in Adıyaman District
Kurdish settlements in Adıyaman Province